Heshan Umendra (born 7 October 1996) is a Sri Lankan cricketer. He made his List A debut for Sri Lanka Air Force Sports Club in the 2018–19 Premier Limited Overs Tournament on 12 March 2019.

References

External links
 

1996 births
Living people
Sri Lankan cricketers
Sri Lanka Air Force Sports Club cricketers
Place of birth missing (living people)